Andrew Staunton (born 18 May 1979) is an Australian cricketer. He played in one first-class match for South Australia in 2003. He took one wicket, that of Andrew Symonds.

Staunton grew up in Sydney, and played for the New South Wales second XI. He moved from Sydney to Adelaide in 2003 to further his career, and made his debut for South Australia that year.

Staunton played for Southern Districts Cricket Club and later coached them for several years, winning a premiership in 2016. Club president Harvey Jolly noted at the time of the premiership that Staunton's "passion, enthusiasm and never-say-die attitude" were infectious.

See also
 List of South Australian representative cricketers

References

External links
 

1979 births
Living people
Australian cricketers
South Australia cricketers
Cricketers from Sydney